Red Vienna (German: Rotes Wien) was the colloquial name for the capital of Austria between 1918 and 1934, when the Social Democratic Workers' Party of Austria (SDAP) maintained almost unilateral political control over Vienna and, for a short time, Austria as a whole. During this time, the SDAP pursued a rigorous program of construction projects across the city in response to severe housing shortages and implemented policies to improve public education, healthcare, and sanitation.

Ultimately, the collapse of the First Austrian Republic in 1934 after the suspension of the Nationalrat by Bundeskanzler Engelbert Dollfuß a year earlier and the subsequent banning of the SDAP in Austria ended the period of the first socialist project in Vienna until after the Second World War. Many of the housing complexes, or Gemeindebauten, that were built during the period continue to survive today.

History 

After the defeat of the Austro-Hungarian Empire in World War I, the Treaty of Saint-Germain-en-Laye was signed between the Empire and the victorious Entente, which stipulated the complete disassembly of the component lands of the Empire into individual nations. Austrian control over its share of the Empire was reduced to the small rump republic of Deutschösterreich (en: Republic of German-Austria), officiated on 12 November 1918. During the war, the German current within the Social Democrats expressed an interest in the idea of the Mitteleuropa proposed by the pan-Germanic nationalist movement within Austria, hoping that a union (Anschluß) with the rest of Germany could stymie some of the major economic problems the new republic was beginning to face.

To the disheartenment of both the Social Democrats and pan-Germanic nationalists alike, the Treaty of Saint-Germain-en-Laye expressly forbade any future union (Anschluß) with the newly founded Weimar Republic, leaving Austria with little territory and limited access to the Hungarian breadbasket that had fed Vienna for decades. In the 4 May 1919 Gemeinderat (en: Municipal Council) elections in the capital, the SDAP gained a majority of seats, with the office of the Mayor of Vienna won by SDAP politician Jakob Reumann. Nationally, the success of the SDAP was far less pronounced, winning only 43.4% of the seats (40.8% of the popular vote) and necessitating a coalition government with the conservative Christian Social Party (CSP), an uncomfortable position from which the SDAP would never fully succeed in overcoming.   During the Geimeinderat elections of 4 May 1919, for the first time in Austrian history, all adult citizens of both sexes had voting rights. The Social Democrats did succeed in electing prominent Austromarxist and SDAP member Karl Renner into office as the interim Staatskanzler, but after the national elections in 1920 concluded with the CSP candidate Michael Mayr succeeding Renner in his position, the SDAP did not successfully manage to elect another national-level leader for the remainder of the First Republic’s existence.

Vienna underwent a host of demographic changes that partly exacerbated the economic issues in the city in the years both during and immediately after the war. Refugees from Austrian Galicia, including roughly 25,000 Jews seeking to avoid the political violence of the Russian Civil War that had spread to the area, had settled in the capital city. At the end of the war, many former soldiers of the Imperial and Royal Army came to stay in Vienna, while many former Imperial-Royal government ministry officials returned to their native lands, creating a large exchange of multiethnic populations both in and out of Vienna in the years that followed. The middle classes, many of whom had bought War Bonds that were now worthless, were plunged into poverty by hyperinflation. New borders between Austria and the nearby regions cut Vienna off from lands that had traditionally fed Vienna for centuries, thus rendering food supply difficult. Existing apartments were overcrowded, and diseases such as tuberculosis, the Spanish flu, and syphilis raged. In the new Austria, Vienna was considered a capital much too big for the small country, and often called Wasserkopf (en: "big head") by people living in other parts of the country. 

On the other hand, optimists saw the dire postwar situation as an opportunity for great sociopolitical transformation. Pragmatic intellectuals like Hans Kelsen, who drafted the republican constitution, and Karl Bühler found a lot to do. For them it was a time of awakening, of new frontiers and of optimism.

The intellectual resources of Red Vienna were remarkable: Ilona Duczyńska and Karl Polanyi, as well as several other socialist intelligentsia relocated to Vienna or went there in exile there from elsewhere, in addition to the city's native Sigmund Freud, Alfred Adler, Karl Bühler, Arthur Schnitzler, Karl Kraus, Ludwig Wittgenstein, Adolf Loos, Arnold Schoenberg and many other scientists, artists, publishers and architects, respectively. While not all socialists participated in the principal opposition of the clerical conservatives, some viewed the development and modernization of Vienna with sympathy.

Karl Polanyi wrote: "Vienna achieved one of the most spectacular cultural triumphs of Western history … an unexampled moral and intellectual rise in the condition of a highly developed industrial working class which, protected by the Vienna system, withstood the degrading effects of grave economic dislocation and achieved a level never reached before by the masses of the people in any industrial society."

However, SDAP rule in Vienna and influence throughout Austria did not go unopposed. Despite the best efforts on the part of the Austromarxists to exert influence on academic institutions and the intellectual cliques both inside and outside Vienna, the much greater influence of conservative Catholic “Blacks” in these institutions was never successfully subdued. The Catholic Church itself was hardly uprooted from its role as the primary spiritual force in Austria; even amongst the working class of Vienna, the Church was at most removed from some elements of city policy, but its enduring influence through social programs, holidays and religious worship over the working class continued throughout SDAP rule.

John Gunther characterized the overall setting of interwar Vienna follows: "The disequilibrium between Marxist Vienna and the clerical countryside was the dominating Motiv of Austrian politics until the rise of Hitler. Vienna was socialist, anti-clerical, and, as a municipality, fairly rich. The hinterland was poor, backward, conservative, Roman Catholic, and jealous of Vienna's higher standard of living."

General politics 

Initiatives of the SDAP-CSP coalition in the first government of the new federation of Deutschösterreich resulted in the legal introduction of the eight-hour day only one week after the republic had been proclaimed in November 1918. Furthermore, an unemployment benefit system was implemented and the Kammer für Arbeiter und Angestellte (en: "Chamber of Workers", colloquially Arbeiterkammer) was founded by law as the workers' official lobby. The enthusiasm for such reforms became smaller and smaller within the CSP in the following two years; particularly after an attempted putsch by more radical communist elements in Vienna on 15 June, 1919, caused the CSP’s confidence in the coalition remaining workable to erode and subsequently aligning with the more radical pan-Germanic GDVP.

In 1920, the SDAP-CSP coalition broke down, resulting in the SDAP losing its parliamentary majority in the 1920 Austrian legislative election, a loss from which the SDAP would not recover. The SDAP continued to govern the City of Vienna, where they reached a comfortable absolute majority in the 1919 elections. Their goal was to make Vienna a shining example of social democratic politics. Their measures at the time were considered outstanding or even spectacular and observed in the whole of Europe. Conservatives in Austria heavily opposed but for the time being nothing could be done against the success of the Social Democrats in Vienna elections.

Vienna had been the political center of the region of Lower Austria for seven centuries. In the decades preceding the collapse of the monarchy, a substantial industrial base had gradually built up in and around the cities of Vienna and Wiener Neustadt. With their strong majority in Vienna and the workers' votes in the industrial region around Wiener Neustadt, the SDAP successfully threw their weight behind the election of Albert Sever as the first democratically-elected governor, the Landeshauptmann (en (lit.): “land-captain”) of Lower Austria, in 1919. After the collapse of the relationship between the SDAP and CSP in 1920, the rural provincial areas of Lower Austria possessed no interest in remaining tied to the social democratic political machine controlling the whole province through Vienna, nor did the socialists in Vienna want to be held back by provincial territory they had long regarded as a dilutive force on their proper representation. As the rural Catholic areas did not want to be governed by "Reds" while the SDAP did not like conservative interference in their modern city politics, the two big parties soon agreed to separate "Red Vienna" from "Black Lower Austria". The national parliament passed the constitutional laws to enable this in 1921; on January 1, 1922, Vienna was re-organised into the ninth, independent Austrian Bundesland (en: "state of the federation").

After 1934, Gunther commented: "In Vienna the socialists produced a remarkable administration, making it probably the most successful municipality in the world. [...] The achievements of the Vienna socialists were the most exhilarating social movement of the post-war period in any European country. Result: the clericals bombed them out of existence."

Policies

Public housing 

Prior to the founding of the First Republic, the Austromarxist current within the SDAP had largely ignored or relegated the matter of public housing to being a problem only solvable with the victory of socialism; nonetheless, as the most pressing issue facing the Gemeinderat after the war, the SDAP was forced to start initiatives to curb the severity of the problem. The Imperial-Royal Government had passed a Mieterschutzgesetz ("Tenant Protection Act”) in 1917 which had been declared applicable in Vienna immediately. Despite ongoing high inflation, the act ordered apartments rents to be frozen at the level present in 1914. This made new private housing projects unprofitable. After the war, demand for affordable apartments therefore grew extremely high. Creating public housing projects became the main concern of the Social Democrats in Vienna.

In 1919, the Wohnunganforderungsgesetz (“Housing Requirement Act”) was passed in the federal parliament with the intention to ease pressure on the housing situation in Vienna. Low private demand for building land and low building costs proved favorable for the city administration's extensive public housing planning.

From 1925 to 1934, more than 60,000 new apartments were built in the Gemeindebau ("Municipal building") buildings. Large blocks were situated around green courts, for instance at the Karl-Marx-Hof. The tenants of said apartments were chosen on the basis of a ranking system in which persons with disabilities and other societally vulnerable groups got extra points in being chosen first. Forty percent of building costs were taken from the proceeds of the Vienna Housing Tax, the rest from the proceeds of the Vienna Luxury Tax and from federal funds. Using public money to cover building costs allowed the rents for these apartments to be kept low. The number of Viennese citizens without homes living in shelters tripled to 80,000 between 1924 and 1934, but the city's building program successfully housed as many as 200,000 people, a tenth of the population.

Social and health services
The Austromarxists of the SDAP invested heavily into the notion of the holistic transformation of the social and physical lives of the Viennese population, which precipitated a multilayered effort of introducing programs that increased standards for sanitation, quality of life improvements through newly created public facilities, and targeted major medical concerns. These new programs were primarily managed by the newly appointed Julius Tandler, a University of Vienna professor and doctor, as well as close associate of numerous figures within the SDAP. Many of the programs were substantial in scope, requiring several years to roll out on a large scale. Propaganda posters published by the Gemeinderat in 1931 also referenced programs that had successfully distributed 53,000 Säuglingspakete (en: "clothing packages") to parents in need, with the stated goal that “Kein Wiener Kind darf auf Zeitungspapier geboren werden” (en: "No child in Vienna shall be born upon newspaper”). Among other programs, the total number of kindergartens was increased fivefold, after-school centers were established to offer children activities, subsidised lunches at schools were introduced, and medical and dental examinations were offered by the schools at no cost to the families of enrolled children. Public bathing facilities were also constructed to aid in increasing hygienic standards. Infant mortality dropped below 50% of pre-war levels, and cases of tuberculosis were slightly reduced.

In 1921, the SDAP majority Gemeinderat of Vienna approved the construction of the Feuerhalle Simmering at the behest of several advocacy groups, most notably the "Workers' Cremation Association" and the magazine Die Flamme (en: “The Flame”). The opening of the crematorium in 1923 quickly grew into a flashpoint in the cultural struggle between the SDAP and their CSP counterparts. The CSP-led national government under Bundeskanzler Ignaz Seipel, under pressure from the Catholic Church, ordered the then-Mayor of Vienna Karl Seitz to conclude operations at the facility, but Seitz refused on account of his office necessitating that he duly enforce the wishes of the Gemeinderat and Bundesland of Vienna.

Seipel, who had earned a reputation for virulent anti-Semitism before he had been elected in 1923, held steadfast to the belief that the Jewish population of Vienna, as well as the Jewish members in the ranks of the SDAP (not least among them Julius Tandler, then the health councillor and head of the ‘Welfare Department’ for the city of Vienna that had backed the crematorium’s opening), were intending to subvert the Catholic moral imperatives that had governed Austrian life for centuries prior. After the CSP brought suit against the Bundesland of Vienna over the continued operation of the crematorium, Seitz was forced to defend his insubordination against the federal administration in the Constitutional Court, which sided with the Vienna state government in 1924 in one of the rare few victories the SDAP was able to score against the pervasive Catholic social apparatus.

Financial policies 

The Social Democrats introduced new taxes by state law, which were collected in addition to federal taxes, colloquially referred to as "Breitner Taxes" in reference to then-Finanzkanzler Hugo Breitner. These taxes were imposed on luxury goods such as riding horses, large private cars, servants in private households, and hotel rooms.

Another new tax, the Wohnbausteuer (en: “Housing Construction Tax”), was also structured as a progressive tax levied in rising percentages concerning income. The revenue from this tax was used to finance the municipality's extensive housing program. However, these two new tax structures only provided a portion of the total funding for Vienna’s municipal welfare, much of which was reliant upon funding from the national government. As time progressed, the reliance on financing from an uncooperative, if not actively hostile federal government left the Gemeinderat vulnerable to pressure from the CSP to roll back some of the municipal programs.

Hugo Breitner, in contrast to the Austrian Social Democrats after 1945, consistently refused to take up credits to finance social services, financing all projects and investments directly through taxation, which allowed the Gemeinderat to avoid taking up debts. Due to overreliance on funding from the Nationalrat, these services consequently had to be cut down when, in the early thirties, the federal government started to financially starve Vienna.

Politicians 

Numerous politicians were associated with Vienna during this period, including but not limited to:

 Jakob Reumann, SDAP politician and first Mayor of Vienna during the First Austrian Republic.
 Karl Seitz, SDAP politician and second Mayor of Vienna during the First Austrian Republic, removed from office in 1934.
 Hugo Breitner [de], Finance Councillor for the City of Vienna, appointed under the administration of Jakob Reumann
 Julius Tandler, Healthcare Councillor for the City of Vienna and professor of anatomy at the University of Vienna
 Otto Glöckel, Minister of Education for the First Austrian Republic

See also 

 History of the Social Democratic Party of Austria
 History of Vienna

References

Further reading 
 

 City of Vienna: From "Red Vienna" to the "Ständestaat" (1918 to 1938)
 Virtual Vienna: Red Vienna: A Workers' Paradise.
  Encyclopedia of Vienna's Social Democratic Party, in German
 Eve Blau: The Architecture of Red Vienna. 1919-1934., The MIT Press, 1999
 Helmut Gruber: Red Vienna. Experiment in Working Class Culture, 1919-1934., Oxford University Press, 1991
 Sheldon Gardner: Red Vienna and the Golden Age of Psychology, 1918-1938 , Praeger Publishers, 1992

Social democracy
Social Democratic Party of Austria
1910s in Vienna
1920s in Vienna
1930s in Vienna
Political history of Austria